David Gregory "Dave" Smith (born 24 July 1955) is a retired male race walker from Australia, who represented his native country at two consecutive Summer Olympics, starting in 1980 (Moscow). His best Olympic result was finishing in tenth place in the men's 20 km race at the 1984 Summer Olympics.

His son, Dane Bird-Smith, also became an international walker for Australia.

International competitions

References

Profile

1955 births
Living people
People from South Australia
Australian male racewalkers
Olympic athletes of Australia
Athletes (track and field) at the 1980 Summer Olympics
Athletes (track and field) at the 1984 Summer Olympics
World Athletics Championships athletes for Australia
Australian Institute of Sport track and field athletes
World Athletics Indoor Championships medalists